Onan Kainoa Satoshi Masaoka (born October 27, 1977) is an American baseball pitcher who played for the Los Angeles Dodgers in 1999 and 2000.

Drafted by the Los Angeles Dodgers in the 3rd round of the 1995 MLB amateur draft, Masaoka made his Major League Baseball debut with the Dodgers on April 5, 1999, and appeared in his final game on September 30, 2000. One of the highlights of Masaoka's brief major league career occurred on July 11, 1999. In the final game prior to the All Star Break, Masaoka pitched 4 innings in relief of winning pitcher Darren Dreifort. He picked up the one and only save of his major league career during the Dodgers 14-3 blowout win over the Mariners. 

The Dodgers traded him to the Chicago White Sox on July 26, 2001 (along with Jeff Barry and Gary Majewski) for James Baldwin and cash. The White Sox assigned him to the AAA Charlotte Knights but released him after the season ended.

He next played professionally with the Gary SouthShore RailCats of the Northern League in 2009 and signed with his hometown Hawaii Stars of the Pacific Association for 2013.

References

External links
  
Onan Masaoka learned in surprise first season
Who’s that lefty?

1977 births
Albuquerque Dukes players
American baseball players of Japanese descent
Baseball players from Hawaii
Charlotte Knights players
Gary SouthShore RailCats players
Hawaii people of Japanese descent
Las Vegas 51s players
Living people
Los Angeles Dodgers players
Major League Baseball pitchers
Native Hawaiian sportspeople
People from Hilo, Hawaii
San Antonio Missions players
Savannah Sand Gnats players
Vero Beach Dodgers players
Yakima Bears players